Djohong is a town and commune in Cameroon.

The village of Djohong dates back to colonial times. Originally it was located in the valley just NE of current Djohong and was named "Dzong."

Population 
Gbaya and Fulbe are the dominant ethnicities in the town with smaller representations of Mbororo, Pana, Tupuri, Bassa and Bamilike. This area of the Adamawa is considered the epicenter of Gbaya population in Cameroon.

Mbere Valley National Park 
The Mbere Valley National Park is a protected nature zone consisting of 77,000 hectares.  The biodiversity in the area is one of the main reasons why the Cameroonian government decided to protect the valley.

Proximity 
Djohong is located 160 km from the provincial capital of Ngaoundere and 90 km from Meiganga. Ngaoui is the nearest large town located 45 km to SE.

Refugee population 
The area surrounding Djohong has a significant refugee population from the Central African Republic.

See also
Communes of Cameroon

References 

 Site de la primature – Élections municipales 2002 
 Contrôle de gestion et performance des services publics communaux des villes camerounaises- Thèse de Donation Avele, Université Montesquieu Bordeaux IV 
 Charles Nanga, La réforme de l’administration territoriale au Cameroun à la lumière de la loi constitutionnelle n° 96/06 du 18 janvier 1996, Mémoire ENA. 

Communes of Cameroon
Populated places in Adamawa Region